The 1950 season was the 39th season in Hajduk Split’s history and their 4th in the Yugoslav First League. Their 3rd place finish in the 1948–49 season meant it was their 4th successive season playing in the Yugoslav First League.

Competitions

Overall

Yugoslav First League

Classification

Matches

Yugoslav First League

Sources: hajduk.hr

Yugoslav Cup

Sources: hajduk.hr

Player seasonal records

Top scorers

Source: Competitive matches

See also
1950 Yugoslav First League
List of unbeaten football club seasons

External sources
 1950 Yugoslav Cup at rsssf.com

HNK Hajduk Split seasons
Hajduk Split
Hajduk Split
Yugoslav football championship-winning seasons